Wild Flowers is a 1982 Canadian drama film written and directed by Jean Pierre Lefebvre. The film won the FIPRESCI Prize at the 1982 Cannes Film Festival and was selected as the Canadian entry for the Best Foreign Language Film at the 55th Academy Awards, but was not accepted as a nominee.

Cast
 Marthe Nadeau
 Michèle Magny
 Pierre Curzi
 Claudia Aubin
 Eric Beauséjour
 Georges Bélisle
 Sarah Mills
 Michel Viala
 Monique Thouin
 Raoul Duguay

See also
 List of submissions to the 55th Academy Awards for Best Foreign Language Film
 List of Canadian submissions for the Academy Award for Best Foreign Language Film

References

External links
 

1982 films
1982 drama films
Canadian drama films
Films directed by Jean Pierre Lefebvre
French-language Canadian films
1980s Canadian films